Raktharakshassu 3D is a 2014 Malayalam-language film by Rupesh Paul, starring Madhu, Sunny Wayne, Ananya and Niyas Mussliyar. The film is based on a Malayalam short story by Rupesh Paul.

Plot
The plot revolves around a renowned writer, his wife who is a fashion designer and their 7-year-old daughter. Upon being insisted by his young and fun-loving wife, he plans a family vacation at an island called Bungalow. Later, they are joined by the wife's uncle. As the story unfolds, the film presents the most bizarre family ever known.

Cast
Sunny Wayne
Ananya
Madhu
Jubil Rajan P Dev
Krishna Prasad
Baby Gowri
Chembil Asokan
Niyaz 
Kulappulli Leela
 Sunil Sukhada
Hima
Binoy
Master Vivas
Deepika

Release
The film was later dubbed and released in Tamil as Yaar Ival.

See also 
 List of Malayalam horror films

References

2014 films
Films shot in Kollam
Films based on short fiction
2010s Malayalam-language films

Indian horror films
2014 horror films